KIEC, formerly known as Kathmandu Infosys, is a private company that serves students intending to study abroad and assists individuals for migration purpose. Its primary services include academic and career counseling, migration service, and standardized and proficiency test preparation. It is headquartered in Dillibazar Road, Kathmandu, in an area that has been referred to as the abroad education hub of the nation. Along with the head office in Dillibazar Road, it has a total of eleven branches in major economic hubs all over Nepal and two global office in Australia.

KIEC is the authorized by Ministry of Education (Nepal) and Educational Consultancies Association of Nepal, Nepal(ECAN).

History
Kathmandu Infosys Educational Consultancy Pvt Ltd (generally known by its acronym KIEC) was founded by Rajendra Rijal on 19 September 2006.

It started its Sydney office on 14 March 2017 and its Melbourne office on 22 July 2018

Professional Achievements
QEAC from PIER Online: QEAC-I042, QEAC-J165, QEAC-K090, QEAC-M133 and QEAC-M433

ITAC from ICEF: ITAC-0069, ITAC-0307, ITAC-1061, ITAC-1063, ITAC-1064 and ITAC-1065

USATC from ICEF-USATC: USCG00046 and USCG00068

Nepal Ministry of Education Certified Institution

Member of Educational Consultancy Association of Nepal.

Controversy 
In 2019, KIEC, along with a number of educational consultancies, were pulled into controversy as hundreds of Nepali students were enrolled in Australian Institute of Business and Technology whose course accreditation was terminated by Australian Skills Quality Authority (ASQA) on 19 February 2019.

References

External links
 

2006 establishments in Nepal
Educational organisations based in Nepal
University and college admissions
Companies based in Sydney
Companies based in Melbourne